The 1981 Grote Prijs Jef Scherens was the 17th edition of the Grote Prijs Jef Scherens cycle race and was held on 20 September 1981. The race started and finished in Leuven. The race was won by Jan Raas.

General classification

References

1981
1981 in road cycling
1981 in Belgian sport
September 1981 sports events in Europe